Bartholdy is a surname. Notable people with the surname include:

Abraham Mendelssohn Bartholdy (born Abraham Mendelssohn, 1776–1835), German Jewish banker and philanthropist
Fanny Mendelssohn (later Fanny [Cäcilie] Mendelssohn Bartholdy, and Fanny Hensel, 1805–1847), pianist and composer, daughter of Abraham
Felix Mendelssohn (Jakob Ludwig Felix Mendelssohn Bartholdy, 1809–1847), composer, pianist, organist and conductor, son of Abraham
Rebecka Mendelssohn (Rebecka Henriette Mendelssohn Bartholdy, later Rebecka Henriette Lejeune Dirichlet, 1811–1858), daughter of Abraham
Jakob Salomon Bartholdy (1779–1825), Prussian diplomat and art patron
Paul Mendelssohn Bartholdy (1841–1880), German chemist and a pioneer in the manufacture of aniline dye
Johan Bartholdy (1853–1904), Danish organist, composer, singing teacher, conductor and author of music theory books
Mikael Bartholdy, Canadian paralympic volleyball player

See also

Bartholdi, a surname
Mendelssohn family
Mendelssohn-Bartholdy-Park (Berlin U-Bahn), a station